Kim Il (20 March 1910 – 9 March 1984) was a North Korean politician who was served as Premier of North Korea from 28 December 1972 to 19 April 1976.

Early life and career
Kim was born on 20 March 1910, in Hamgyong Province to a poor family of peasants. Kim joined the underground Communist Party in 1932 and fought against Japanese colonial rule from 1935. After the liberation of Korea in 1945, he served as secretary of the Party Committee of Pyongan Province. He was appointed to different important military posts since 1946. Kim Il was elected to the 1st Central Committee on 24 November 1946 and remained a member until his death. After the Democratic People's Republic of Korea proclaimed independence in 1948, he was elected to the 2nd Standing Committee of the Workers' Party of Korea (WPK) and in 1953 he was elected to the 2nd WPK Political Committee (later renamed "Presidium"). In 1954, he became the Minister of Agriculture in the North Korean Cabinet replacing Pak Mun-gyu. He was then appointed his country's First Vice Premier in 1956. Kim was elected a delegate to the 1st, 2nd, 3rd, 4th and 5th Supreme People's Assembly (SPA). By 1970, he was the highest-ranking member of WPK after Kim Il-sung and Choe Yong-gon.

In 1966, Kim Il-sung did not deliver his usual New Year's address. Although the reason is not definitely known, North Korean sources state that he was distracted by the news that Kim Il had been diagnosed with cancer and skipped the address to make arrangements for Kim's medical treatment.

In the 1960s, Kim furthered the North Korean position of independence from both the Soviet Union and China in the Sino-Soviet split. He tried to persuade Romania to stay out of Comecon like North Korea. Kim also took part in the negotiations of trade and defense pacts with the Soviet Union. By March 1967, he declared the conclusion of economic and military agreements with Moscow. He was named Premier in 1972 after Kim Il-sung gave up his premiership to become the President of North Korea. Kim Il was Premier until his resignation on 30 April 1976, due to failing health.

Vice Presidency
Kim immediately became the Vice President, appointed by the SPA. His appointment was renewed on 15 December 1977. He served until his death in 1984, alongside Pak Sung-chul, also Vice President.

Kim was elected to the Presidium of the Politburo of the WPK at the 6th WPK Congress in 1980. At the Congress, Kim Il-sung had proposed Korean reunification under a "Democratic Federal Republic of Koryo", but only if the South Korean president Chun Doo-hwan was ousted. When Chun responded in his New Year's speech of 1981, asking Kim Il-sung to visit the South instead, Kim Il stepped in to denounce the South Korean administration and to call for all of Kim Il-sung's demands to be met before any dialogue could take place. Kim Il issued a statement, saying: "This is nothing but a foolish burlesque designed to whitewash [Chun's] dirty nation-splitting nature and gain public favor with the 'presidential election' at hand... As we have already announced clearly, Chun Doo Hwan is not a man worthy for us to do anything with... [The proposal is] a foolish act of a rogue who does not know where his place is." Kim said:

Three weeks later, Kim Il, in the capacity of Chairman of the Committee for the Peaceful Reunification of the Fatherland, demanded that a conference of 50 people representing the North and 50 the South should be organized. The proposal included the names of the desired Southern representatives, who included prominent politicians of parties banned in South Korea in 1980, but none from its ruling party.

Kim spent much of 1982 receiving medical treatment in Romania. Even after his reappearance in 1983, his health remained poor as evidenced by him missing numerous ceremonial gatherings. He died on 9 March 1984, aged 73. He was awarded a state funeral presided over by a 69-strong funeral committee. His death is said to have marked the end of the period of dominance of the "old guard" of political leaders who were with Kim Il-sung before he ascended to power. At the time of his death, Kim Il was ranked second only to Kim Il-sung and formally outranked even Kim Jong-il, Kim Il-sung's designated successor. Kim Il had been reportedly critical of Kim Jong-il. Nevertheless, KCNA called him the "closest and finest revolutionary comrade-in-arms" of Kim Il-sung and his death "a painful, big loss to our party and people".

Works

References

Works cited

  

Prime Ministers of North Korea
Vice presidents of North Korea
1910 births
1984 deaths
Korean independence activists
Korean communists
Vice Chairmen of the Workers' Party of Korea and its predecessors
Members of the 6th Politburo of the Workers' Party of Korea
Members of the 1st Central Committee of the Workers' Party of North Korea
Members of the 2nd Central Committee of the Workers' Party of Korea
Members of the 3rd Central Committee of the Workers' Party of Korea
Members of the 4th Central Committee of the Workers' Party of Korea
Members of the 5th Central Committee of the Workers' Party of Korea
Members of the 6th Central Committee of the Workers' Party of Korea
Members of the 2nd Political Committee of the Workers' Party of Korea
Members of the 2nd Standing Committee of the Workers' Party of Korea
Members of the 3rd Standing Committee of the Workers' Party of Korea
Members of the 4th Political Committee of the Workers' Party of Korea
Members of the 5th Political Committee of the Workers' Party of Korea
Members of the 6th Presidium of the Workers' Party of Korea
Members of the 1st Supreme People's Assembly
Members of the 2nd Supreme People's Assembly
Members of the 3rd Supreme People's Assembly
Members of the 4th Supreme People's Assembly
Members of the 5th Supreme People's Assembly
Members of the 6th Supreme People's Assembly
Members of the 7th Supreme People's Assembly
People of 88th Separate Rifle Brigade